Multifactorial (having many factors) can refer to:
 The multifactorial in mathematics.
 Multifactorial inheritance, a pattern of predisposition for a disease process.